The 2005–06 UCI Africa Tour was the second season of the UCI Africa Tour. The season began on 26 October 2005 with the Tour du Faso and ended on 17 September 2006 with the Tour du Sénégal.

The points leader, based on the cumulative results of previous races, wears the UCI Africa Tour cycling jersey. Tiaan Kannemeyer from South Africa was the defending champion of the 2005 UCI Africa Tour. Rabaki Jérémie Ouédraogo of Burkina Faso was crowned as the 2005–06 UCI Africa Tour champion.

Throughout the season, points are awarded to the top finishers of stages within stage races and the final general classification standings of each of the stages races and one-day events. The quality and complexity of a race also determines how many points are awarded to the top finishers, the higher the UCI rating of a race, the more points are awarded.
The UCI ratings from highest to lowest are as follows:
 Multi-day events: 2.HC, 2.1 and 2.2
 One-day events: 1.HC, 1.1 and 1.2

Events

2005

2006

Final standings

Individual classification

Team classification

Nation classification

External links
 

UCI Africa Tour

2006 in African sport
2005 in African sport